GuideIT is a privately held information technology services provider founded in 2013 by a group of former Perot Systems and Dell Services employees.  Based in Plano, Texas, United States, GuideIT provides information technology services in the industries of health care, banking, insurance and others. The company’s offerings include IT services, technology consulting, health care solutions, and enterprise technology solutions. Health care accounts for about half of the company's revenue as of 2018, from services such as implementation of electronic health records systems.

A CRN-recognized IT managed services provider, GuideIT employs more than 200 people as of December 2022. In addition to its headquarters in Plano, Texas, the company operates call centers and tech-support desks in Wichita Falls, Texas.

History 
Former Perot Systems and Dell Services employees Scott Barnes, Russell Freeman, Jack Evans, John Furniss, and Tim Morris, founded GuideIT in 2013, after Dell acquired Perot Systems for approximately $3.9 billion in 2009. In 2014, the Perot Group led by Ross Perot Jr. became the largest stakeholder of the company

In 2014, Chuck Lyles became CEO of Guide IT, replacing Scott Barnes, one of the company’s founders who went on to serve as managing director. Lyles had previously been president of the company’s health care solutions division.

Recognition 
In 2022, GuideIT was named to the CRN Managed Service Provider (MSP) 500 list in the Security 100 category. The company has also been recognized by the Dallas Business Journal on its list of “Best Places to Work” (2015), and by the SMU Cox Caruth Institute as one of the “Fastest-Growing Private Companies in the Metroplex” (2016, 2017, & 2020).

References